Shivam Bhambri (born 30 September 1995) is an Indian cricketer. He made his List A debut on 1 October 2019, for Chandigarh in the 2019–20 Vijay Hazare Trophy. He made his Twenty20 debut on 8 November 2019, for Chandigarh in the 2019–20 Syed Mushtaq Ali Trophy, scoring 106 runs from 57 balls. He made his first-class debut on 9 December 2019, for Chandigarh in the 2019–20 Ranji Trophy, scoring 105 runs in the first innings. He became the first cricketer to score a century on his Twenty20 and first-class debuts.

References

External links
 

1995 births
Living people
Indian cricketers
Chandigarh cricketers
Place of birth missing (living people)